The 1976 Baltimore International was a men's tennis tournament played on indoor carpet courts at the University of Maryland Baltimore County Fieldhouse in Baltimore, Maryland in the United States. The event was part of the 1976 USTA-IPA Indoor Circuit. It was the fifth edition of the tournament and was held from January 20 through January 25, 1976. Unseeded Tom Gorman won the singles title and earned $12,000 first-prize money.

Finals

Singles
 Tom Gorman defeated  Ilie Năstase 7–5, 6–3
 It was Gorman's 1st singles title of the year and the 6th of his career.

Doubles
 Bob Hewitt /  Frew McMillan defeated  Ilie Năstase /  Cliff Richey 3–6, 7–6, 6–4

References

External links
 ITF tournament edition details

1976 in American tennis
1976 in sports in Maryland
January 1976 sports events in the United States
February 1976 sports events in the United States